The Color of Money is a 1984 novel by American novelist Walter Tevis. It is the sequel to his 1959 novel, The Hustler. It was his sixth and final book before his death in the year of publication.

Plot
The novel is set twenty years after The Hustler. Fast Eddie now runs a pool hall of his own. After seeing a lookalike of Minnesota Fats on the television, he decides to go in search of the real one, whom he finds in the Florida Keys. Eddie persuades Fats to go on a national tour. He meets Arabella, an English woman, who moves in with him. The finale is set at Lake Tahoe, where Eddie manages to best a number of younger players.

Television is a major subplot. At the beginning, Eddie watches most of his pool on the television, and tends to play the game by himself.

Film adaptation
The novel was adapted into a 1986 drama film directed by Martin Scorsese from a screenplay by Richard Price, based on Tevis' novel. The film differs greatly from the novel in terms of plot, and does not feature the Minnesota Fats character. Although Tevis did author a screenplay for the film, having adapted the storyline directly from his novel, the filmmakers decided not to use it, instead crafting an entirely different story under Tevis' title.

The film stars Paul Newman and Tom Cruise, with Mary Elizabeth Mastrantonio, Helen Shaver, and John Turturro. The film featured an original score by Robbie Robertson.

References

External links
 The Color of Money (archived)
 Cue Jumping

1984 American novels
Novels by Walter Tevis
Cue sports literature
American sports novels
American novels adapted into films
Warner Books books